Pablo Eduardo Islas (born 19 February 1979), commonly known as Islas, is an Argentinian former footballer who last played for Club Atlético San Miguel. He made his Serie B debut with FBC Unione Venezia  in the 2003-2004 season.

References

External links 
 

1979 births
Living people
Argentine footballers
Association football forwards
Serie A players
Serie B players
Argentine expatriate footballers
Expatriate footballers in Italy
Argentine expatriate sportspeople in Italy
FC Cartagena footballers
Venezia F.C. players
Footballers from Buenos Aires